Pseudodoliops is a genus of longhorn beetles of the subfamily Lamiinae, containing the following species:

 Pseudodoliops bicolor (Vives, 2012)
 Pseudodoliops cagayanus (Vives, 2012)
 Pseudodoliops ditumaboensis Barševskis, 2018
 Pseudodoliops elegans (Heller, 1916)
 Pseudodoliops griseus Breuning, 1938
 Pseudodoliops ilocanus Vives, 2011
 Pseudodoliops rufipes (Aurivillius, 1927)
 Pseudodoliops weigeli Vives, 2015

References

Apomecynini